Justin Gary is an American Magic: The Gathering player. At age 17, Gary was U.S. junior champion in 1997. His most notable Pro Tour finish is his win at Pro Tour Houston 2002. Rob Dougherty and Darwin Kastle who both tested with Gary finished second and third respectively at the same event. In 2010, Gary founded Gary Games. In August 2010 the first product, Ascension: Chronicle of the Godslayer, was introduced at Gen Con. The deck-building game, designed by Gary along with Brian Kibler, John Fiorillo, and Rob Dougherty, received a larger introduction in 2012 through a Kickstarter campaign. That same year the company changed its name to Stone Blade Entertainment, and in 2013 they followed up their release of Ascension with the development and limited production of SolForge, a digital-only collectible card game.

Achievements

References

American Magic: The Gathering players
Year of birth missing (living people)
Living people
Sportspeople from Carlsbad, California
American game designers